Daniel "Darth" Vladař (born 20 August 1997) is a Czech professional ice hockey goaltender for the Calgary Flames of the National Hockey League (NHL). Selected by the Boston Bruins in the 2015 NHL Entry Draft, Vladař played several years in his native Czech Republic before moving to North America in 2015. After four seasons in the minor leagues he made his NHL debut with the Bruins during the 2020 Stanley Cup playoffs.

Playing career
Vladař played in the Czech Republic, and made his debut in the 1st Czech Republic Hockey League, the second highest league, during the 2014–15 season. He was selected 75th overall by the Boston Bruins in the 2015 NHL Entry Draft, and moved to North America to join the Chicago Steel of the United States Hockey League for the 2015–16 season. He joined the Bruins' American Hockey League affiliate, the Providence Bruins for the 2016–17 season, and split the next four seasons between Providence and the Bruins' ECHL affiliate the Atlanta Gladiators. Two concussions limited his first pro season, and prior to the 2017–18 season Vladař broke both his wrists, which delayed his start.

After the pause during the 2019–20 season, due to the COVID-19 pandemic, Vladař was included in the Bruins Return to Play roster and remained on the team as the club's third choice goaltender for the post-season. During the 2020 Stanley Cup playoffs, Vladař was elevated to the backup goaltender role after the withdrawal of starting goaltender Tuukka Rask. On 24 August 2020, he was signed to a three-year contract extension by the Bruins, with the final season of his new deal to be a one-way contract.

Vladař made his NHL debut on 26 August 2020 against the Tampa Bay Lightning in relief of starting goaltender Jaroslav Halák.

To start the 2020–21 season Vladař was loaned to Dynamo Pardubice of the Czech Extraliga. He played six games there before returning to the Bruins pre-season camp. Vladař's first NHL start, and first regular season game, came on 16 March 2021 against the Pittsburgh Penguins. Vladař made 34 saves as Boston won the game 2–1.

On 28 July 2021, Vladař was traded by the Bruins to the Calgary Flames in exchange for a  third-round draft pick in 2022.

International play 

Vladař has won two medals representing Czech Republic. He won silver at the IIHF World U18 Championships in 2014 as the backup goalie and then won another silver medal at the 2014 Ivan Hlinka Memorial Tournament. In the latter he once again played as the backup, only playing 16:51 in his sole game.

Career statistics

Regular season and playoffs

International

References

External links
 

1997 births
Living people
Atlanta Gladiators players
Boston Bruins draft picks
Boston Bruins players
Calgary Flames players
Chicago Steel players
Czech expatriate ice hockey players in Canada
Czech expatriate ice hockey players in the United States
Czech ice hockey goaltenders
HC Dynamo Pardubice players
Providence Bruins players
Rytíři Kladno players
Ice hockey people from Prague